The Battle of Raciborz took place in the Polish town of Raciborz, on 20 March 1241, during the Mongol invasion of Poland. It ended in the victory of a Polish army from Silesia, commanded by Duke  of Opole and Raciborz, Mieszko II the Fat. 

On 20 March 1241, units of the Mongol Army reached the Oder near Raciborz, and began to cross the river. Duke Mieszko II the Fat, aware of this, decided to attack the invaders while they were busy trying to get across the Oder. After the battle, Mieszko's army headed towards Legnica, where Christian forces under Duke Henry II the Pious concentrated to engage the Mongols in the Battle of Legnica.

Sources 
 Piastowie. Leksykon biograficzny, wyd. 1999, str. 397
	Wielka Historia Polski cz. do 1320, wyd. Pinexx 1999, s. 187-188
	Stanislaw Krakowski, Polska w walce z najazdami tatarskimi w XIII wieku, wyd. MON 1956, str.136-137

1241 in Europe
Racibórz
Racibórz
Racibórz